Catocha is a genus of wood midges in the family Cecidomyiidae. There are eight described species. The genus was established in 1833 by Irish entomologist Alexander Henry Haliday.

Species
Catocha angulata Jaschhof, 2009
Catocha barberi Felt, 1913
Catocha betsyae (Pritchard, 1960)
Catocha brachycornis (Spungis & Jaschhof, 2000)
Catocha incisa Jaschhof, 2009
Catocha indica Mani, 1934
Catocha latipes Haliday, 1833
Catocha subalpina Jaschhof, 2009

References

Cecidomyiidae genera

Insects described in 1833
Taxa named by Alexander Henry Haliday